Silver Bluff in  Jackson, South Carolina consists of  of cultivated fields and wooded area overlooking the Savannah River. It was the site of an Indian trading post in the 1740s. The community disappeared around the turn of the 20th century. Silver Bluff was listed in the National Register of Historic Places on November 1, 1977.

References

External links

Archaeological sites on the National Register of Historic Places in South Carolina
Buildings and structures in Aiken County, South Carolina
National Register of Historic Places in Aiken County, South Carolina